Stapleford is a village located approximately 4 miles to the south of Cambridge, in the county of Cambridgeshire, in eastern England on the right-hand bank of the River Granta. Stapleford is first mentioned in 956 when it was given the Latinised name of Stapelforda, formerly Stapleton. Unlike most parishes, the spelling has hardly changed since then. The parish, however, was inhabited long before this. Wandlebury Ring, which lies within the parish boundary, is an Iron Age hill fort, originally built in the 3rd century BC, but rebuilt with a double bank in the 1st century AD. More recently, the village found fame with the discovery that Barack Obama is a direct descendant of one Thomas Blossom, who grew up here towards the end of the 16th century before emigrating to the United States.

Stapleford is home to two pubs, The Rose and The Three Horseshoes,. The village also is home to Saint Andrew's church, a primary school, several garages, two hairdressers, allotments, a youth football club, a cricket team and several farms.

Famous ex-residents include Robert Huff (racing driver) and Nobel laureates Sir John Sulston and Sir James Mirrlees.

From 1750 to 1755, John Berridge, the later evangelist, served as curate in Stapleford near Cambridge, riding out from Clare College.
He performed his duties with "a sincere desire to do good". He preached and taught "the importance of sanctification". Yet, as Berridge later reflected, his ministry in Stapleford was fruitless because he neither believed nor preached the gospel of justification by faith. Because he believed that he was having "no beneficial effect, spiritual or moral" on his congregation, he resigned, later to become vicar of Everton, near Sandy.

Stapleford is twinned with Villedomer, in the Loire region of France.  Stapleford is also twinned with Nachingwea, one of the six districts in the Lindi Region of Tanzania.

References

External links

 2001 Census
 Stapleford Community Primary School
 Nachingwea Link Committee Website
 Saint Andrews church
 Stapleford Village website
 Neighbourhood Plan
 Stapleford Online community website
 The Stapleford History Society
 Stapleford Phoenix Cricket Club

Villages in Cambridgeshire
Civil parishes in Cambridgeshire
South Cambridgeshire District